Conny Ivarsson (born 15 April 1965) is a former speedway rider from Sweden.

Speedway career 
Ivarsson was a leading speedway rider during the 1980s. He reached the final of the Speedway World Championship in the 1988 Individual Speedway World Championship.

He rode in the top tier of British Speedway during the 1987 British League season, riding for Swindon Robins.

Family
His brother Claes Ivarsson was also an international speedway rider.

References 

1965 births
Living people
Swedish speedway riders
Swindon Robins riders